Fernwood State Forest is a state forest in Jefferson County, Ohio, United States.

References

Ohio state forests
Protected areas of Jefferson County, Ohio